This list of churches in Aarhus lists church buildings in Aarhus, Denmark.

See also
 Listed buildings in Aarhus Municipality

Aarhus
 
Aarhus